Bungea is a genus of plants, belonging to the family Orobanchaceae.

The genus is named after Alexander von Bunge.

References

External links

Orobanchaceae
Orobanchaceae genera